Beathard is a surname. Notable people with the surname include:
 Bobby Beathard (born 1937), American sports executive
 Casey Beathard (born 1965), American country music songwriter
 C. J. Beathard (born 1993), American football player
 Pete Beathard (born 1942), American football player
 Tucker Beathard (born 199?), American country music singer and songwriter